is a Catholic girls  (Irish language secondary school) in Dublin, Ireland.

In 2008 and 2014, 100% of students went on to third level education.  It was ranked second in 2011 and 2010 by The Irish Times Good Schools Guide.

History 
In 1968 the Christian Brothers allocated land from its land part of the St. Helen's period house for the building of two schools: a girls' school, Coláiste Íosagáin, was established in 1971 under the control of the Sisters of Mercy, and a boys' school, Coláiste Eoin, under the control of the Christian Brothers. The school occupied temporary premises at Carysfort College, Blackrock from 1971-1975 when it moved to the Stillorgan Road new building. In 1983, President Hillery opened the new Coláiste Íosagáin school.

Sport 
The school has Gaelic football, camogie, basketball, and athletics teams. Camogie teams traditionally compete at Under 16 and Under 18 at B-League levels within the province of Leinster. In 2011, the Ladies B Under 18 Gaelic football team won the Inter-Schools All-Ireland Cup.

New buildings

Early in the 1990s it was deemed that the school's existing single storey buildings, built in the 1970s, were too small to accommodate the expansion of both Coláiste Eoin and Íosagáin. It was decided that the school would require both a new classroom block and a sports hall/auditorium. The project, however, experienced difficulties from the outset due to a lack of funds. It took many years of collecting voluntary donations from parents and other members of the public for the project to even reach the planning stage. A second barrier was posed by the fact that additional accommodation could only be placed in a constricted rear area of the site, because the existing grass, Gaelic pitch to the south of this site was "sacrosanct". This restricted site condition caused the new building to be formed into two shared elements: a four storey academic block, and a sports hall with performance space. Despite these difficulties, building finally commenced in 2001, of a Grafton Architects-designed structure that met with all the schools requirements. The project was completed in 2003 and has since won an award at the Royal Institute of the Architects of Ireland Awards 2004. Work later commenced for a new building to be built on the far-side of Coláiste Íosagáin's main building, on a small side section of the school grass pitch in summer of 2013. The building consists of new classrooms, new changing rooms and chiefly, a school oratory. The building was completed in early December 2013 and is named 'Aireagal', because the main principle of the building is to provide an oratory for the students. This building completed the refurbishment of the school, and means that no more classes are held in prefabricated buildings.

Notable past pupils

 Niamh Cusack – Actress known on TV for Heartbeat, A & E and on stage for The Curious Dog in the Night-time, Three Sisters, His Dark Materials
 Sinéad Goldrick – Dublin senior ladies' footballer
 Clíona Ní Bhuachalla -  RTÉ presenter, helped set up Irish language soap ‘Ros na Rún’. Established Icebox Films 
 Bláthnaid Ní Chofaigh - TV presenter, Echo Island, The Afternoon Show and Charity ICA Bootcamp 7rl
 Niamh Nic Mhathúna - Founding member of Youth Defence
 Síofra Cléirigh Büttner - runner
 Ola Majekodunmi - radio presenter
 Una Mullally - Irish journalist and broadcaster
 Críona Ní Dhálaigh - Ardmhéara Baile Átha Cliath

References

External links 
Coláiste Íosagáin website
Prospectus. Coláiste Íosagáin. Retrieved on 2008-08-22.

Educational institutions established in 1971
Girls' schools in the Republic of Ireland
Catholic secondary schools in the Republic of Ireland
Secondary schools in Dún Laoghaire–Rathdown
Booterstown
1971 establishments in Ireland
Sisters of Mercy schools